Avesnes is a commune in the Pas-de-Calais department in northern France.

Geography
The commune is a very small village situated some 12 miles (19 km) northeast of Montreuil-sur-Mer, on the D 129 E 1.

Population

See also
Communes of the Pas-de-Calais department

References

Communes of Pas-de-Calais